The 2012–13 Spartak Moscow season was the club's 21st season in the Russian Premier League, the highest tier of association football in Russia. They finished the season in fourth place, qualifying for the UEFA Europa League; reached the round of 16 in the Russian Cup; and were knocked out 2012–13 UEFA Champions League at the group stage.

Spartak started the season under the management of Unai Emery, who they appointed as manager in June 2012 after Valery Karpin resigned following the completion of the previous season. Emery lasted five months before being sacked on 25 November, and Karpin was appointed caretaker manager before being handed the job permanently on 13 December 2012.

Squad

On loan

Left club during season

Transfers

In

Loans in

Out

Loans out

Released

Friendlies

Competitions

Russian Premier League

Results by round

Results

Table

Russian Cup

UEFA Champions League

Play-off round

Group stage

Squad statistics

Appearances and goals

|-
|colspan="14"|Players away from the club on loan:

|-
|colspan="14"|Players who appeared for Spartak Moscow but left during the season:

|}

Goal scorers

Clean sheets

Disciplinary record

References

FC Spartak Moscow seasons
Spartak Moscow
Spartak Moscow